John Noyes may refer to:
 John Noyes (politician), member of the United States House of Representatives from Vermont
 John Humphrey Noyes, American preacher, radical religious philosopher, and utopian socialist
 John Noyes (entomologist), Welsh entomologist